The women's 50 metre freestyle competition at the 1999 Pan Pacific Swimming Championships took place on August 28–29 at the Sydney International Aquatic Centre.  The last champion was Le Jingyi of China.

This race consisted of one length of the pool in freestyle.

Records
Prior to this competition, the existing world and Pan Pacific records were as follows:

Results
All times are in minutes and seconds.

Heats
The first round was held on August 28.

Semifinals
The semifinals were held on August 28.

Final 
The final was held on August 29.

References

1999 Pan Pacific Swimming Championships
1999 in women's swimming